Pradeep Kalipurayath is an Indian advertising director, cinematographer, filmmaker known for his work predominantly in south Indian advertisements and corporate films. His first taste of fame came with having produced and directed a music video featuring India’s first Malayalam rock band ‘Avial’ in 2005 who moved on to be quite the sensation across the world. It was one of the first YouTube videos that had become popular in India. Ad films, documentaries and television shows have been made under the banner of Poorman Productions since 2006.

His initial pieces of work as a cinematographer included Independent Indian English films like ‘I Just Don't Get It’, ‘That Four Letter Word’ and ‘Good Night, Good Morning. His first Tamil feature film as a cinematographer is ‘Saithan, a Vijay Antony Film Corporation Production, which was scheduled to be released in 2016.

Kalipurayath’s first directorial venture ‘Strange’ is an English short feature film in the Under 40-minute Category. The movie is presently getting ready for release at film festivals. In addition to directing the film, he also wrote the story and screenplay for the film. Pradeep Kalipurayath has set up Poorman Productions primarily to promote independent artistes and music bands and to help them reach limelight through music videos. Poorman Productions provides international production support with strategic tie-ups in the UAE, Oman, USA and Australia. Producing and directing documentaries, advertising films and line production for international productions are the prime business.

Early life

Pradeep was born in Chennai, Tamil Nadu to Ramakrishnan Nallur and Renuka Kalipurayath from Palakkad, Kerala. His interest in arts and photography from a young age stems from his father who was a photography hobbyist. He completed his schooling from Union Christian School, Chennai. He later joined SRM Arts and Science College, Chennai, affiliated to the University of Madras, to study BSc Visual Communications. A chance meeting with a man named Sharat Haridasan inspired him to become an ad film maker. He started off as a freelance assistant director to ad film makers like Jabbar Kallarakkal. However, he got his major breakthrough as a Producer/Director for Avial, the Malayalam rock band.

Advertising career

Inspired by the works of Rajeev Menon from college days, Kalipurayath started associating with Rajeev Menon Productions for all his post-production needs. His editor Praveen Prabhakaran helped him edit Nada Nada a music video that gave him the confidence to start out as an Independent ad film maker. Pradeep Kalipurayath moved on to take small corporate films and ad films for the regional market. Kalipurayath did his first national advertisement with SPIC 20 20 fertilizer, which was played in all rural theatres across Tamil Nadu.

Poorman Productions’ corporate identity was conceptualized by Tribe 10 Advertising, which won them a Bronze Award at the Advertisement Club Awards of 2007 in Chennai.

Pradeep Kalipurayath’s production house is set up in Chennai and his agency clients range from Dentzu, Ogilvy & Mather, Tribe 10, to direct clients like Surana & Surana International Attorneys, Audio Media Inc., AAT and Rohit Jayakaran Productions.

Television works

Pradeep Kalipurayath has a notable career in the television industry. He has directed more than 50 television snippets for Doordarshan ‘Nalam Kaane’, a show featuring home remedies and tips by renowned doctors specializing in various types of medical practices. He has also worked at SS music as an Executive Producer.

Pradeep Kalipurayath has been Creative head at Kosmic Studios in 2007 where they independent music artists and bands and helped with a breakthrough into the entertainment industry.

In 2008, Pradeep Kalipurayath met N. Thirumurugan from Media Magic. Their friendship and partnership has fetched innumerable projects from the manufacturing market in the form of corporate films. They went on to produce and directs corporate films for Henkel, ICICI, Salakorn, Taj Mahal Agro industries and many more. They have also collaborated to direct shows like ‘Sokkuthey Manam’, a musical show on Jaya TV, an external production that garnered a huge following at the time. Old soundtracks from Tamil films were recreated and sung on stage by renowned singer Priya Subramanyam.

Kalipurayath turned director for many popular TV shows in south India like Vivel Active Fair Big Break and Supervising Producer for Ningalkum Aagam Kodeeshwaran (KBC MALAYALAM) Season One.

Imagine Movies, a Dubai-based television channel’s maiden show, City Dil Se invited Pradeep Kalipurayath to direct 13 episodes on the lifestyle of Dubai. The RJ’s from City 1016 were the hosts on the show. The program was aired repeatedly for over a year and the RJ-turned-host won many awards and endorsements through the show.

Non film works

His recent work includes a story through photographs made for a coffee-table book ‘Metamorphosis’ made in collaboration with contemporary dancer Aparna Nagesh and her all girls dance ensemble, High Kicks. The book brings out the life and journey of a contemporary female dancer in India with photographs presented in great print quality clicked over the span of five years. The photographs are clicked by Pradeep Kalipurayath and this is the first book to showcase him as a photographer.

Filmography

Director [edit]

Strange (Short Film)

Safe - 2019

Cinematography[edit]

2007 - I Just Don't Get It

2008 - That Four Letter Word

2015 - Touch

2016 - Saithan

As producer

2006 - Nada Nada - Malayalam rock single featuring Avial: John. P.Varky, Tony, Rex Vijayan Anand and Joffey

2010 – Prana, The Band

2012- Rahlaap- Rahul Nambiar and Aalap Raju.

As freelancer

2008 - Good Hair (Behind-the-scenes photography)

2009 - Manchadikuru (Behind-the-scenes filmmaking)

2009 - Good Night, Good Morning (Additional Cinematography)

2014 - Shastram Trailer (Cinematography & Line Producer)

References

External links
 
 Shastram Trailer

1981 births
Living people
Indian advertising directors
Tamil film cinematographers
Film directors from Chennai